Pakali is part of Sub-metropolitan city Itahari. It has a famous temple of Goddess Bhawani called as (Jabdi). At the time of the 1991 Nepal census, it had a population of 9500.
Now, Itahari is a sub-metropolitan city.

References

Populated places in Sunsari District